Natasha, Pierre & The Great Comet of 1812 (or simply The Great Comet) is a sung-through musical adaptation of a 70-page segment from Leo Tolstoy's 1869 novel War and Peace written by composer/lyricist Dave Malloy and directed by Rachel Chavkin. It is based on Part 8 of Tolstoy's novel, focusing on Natasha's affair with Anatole and Pierre's search for meaning in his life.

The musical originally ran at the Ars Nova in 2012, followed by 2013 stagings in both the Meatpacking District and the Theater District of Manhattan, a 2014 Spanish-language staging in Quito, Ecuador, and a 2015 remounting at the American Repertory Theater in Cambridge, Massachusetts. The Great Comet premiered on Broadway in November 2016 at the Imperial Theatre, and closed in September 2017.

The original Off-Broadway production of the show had Dave Malloy playing Pierre Bezukhov. Once the show was taken to Broadway, Josh Groban made his Broadway debut in the role of Pierre.

The musical received positive reviews, particularly for Phillipa Soo, Denée Benton, and Josh Groban's leading performances, as well as for the production's score, direction, and scenic design. The show was nominated for 12 awards – the highest number of nominations in the season – for the 2017 Tony Awards, including Best Musical, Best Original Score, Best Book of a Musical, Best Actress in a Musical for Benton, Best Actor in a Musical for Groban, Best Featured Actor in a Musical for Lucas Steele, and Best Direction of a Musical for Chavkin. It won two awards: Best Scenic Design for Mimi Lien and Best Lighting Design in a Musical for Bradley King.

Synopsis

Act I
The musical begins in 1812, Moscow, Russia, by introducing the characters ("Prologue"). The audience is then introduced to Pierre Bezukhov, a depressed, unhappily married man ("Pierre"). He is a good friend of Andrey Bolkonsky, who is away fighting in the war. Andrey has recently become engaged to Natasha Rostova. Natasha and her cousin, Sonya Rostova, arrive in Moscow to visit Natasha’s godmother, Marya Dmitrievna, and wait for Andrey to come home ("Moscow"). Natasha is to meet her future in-laws, Andrey’s sister, the lonely Mary Bolkonskaya, and his father, the lunatic Old Prince Bolkonsky ("The Private and Intimate Life of the House"). However, their meeting ends in disaster, as Natasha finds Mary cold, Mary finds Natasha vain, and Bolkonsky behaves bizarrely ("Natasha & Bolkonskys"). Natasha leaves, missing Andrey more than ever ("No One Else").

The next night, Natasha watches an opera with Sonya and Marya. Natasha catches the eye of Anatole Kuragin, a notorious rogue ("The Opera"). Anatole visits Natasha in her box and leaves her with feelings she has never experienced before ("Natasha & Anatole").

Anatole arrives home after the opera and goes out drinking with his friend, Fedya Dolokhov, and Pierre. They are met by Hélène Bezukhova, the unfaithfully promiscuous wife of Pierre and shamelessly suggestive sister of Anatole. Anatole lusts for Natasha, although it is revealed he is already married. Hélène flirts with Dolokhov, who taunts Pierre by raising a toast to "married women and their lovers". A drunk Pierre finds Dolokhov's behavior insulting and challenges him to a duel. Pierre accidentally wounds Dolokhov and Dolokhov miraculously misses him. Before they all leave, Anatole asks Hélène to invite Natasha to a ball that evening and she agrees. ("The Duel"). They leave Pierre, who reflects on his near-death experience and realizes that despite wasting his life, he wishes to live ("Dust and Ashes").

The next morning, as Natasha is preparing for church, she is confused about her feelings from her interaction with Anatole at the opera and questions if she is spoiled of Andrey's love ("Sunday Morning"). Later that day, Hélène visits Natasha and invites her to the ball. Natasha eventually agrees to attend ("Charming").

That night at the ball, Natasha is met by Anatole, and they dance. Anatole professes his love to Natasha, who tries to tell him that she is already engaged. Ignoring this, Anatole kisses Natasha, leading her to fall in love with him in return ("The Ball").

Act II
Natasha is further torn between her feelings for both Andrey and Anatole ("Letters"). Sonya discovers letters between Natasha and Anatole and learns of their relationship. She confronts Natasha and desperately explains her distrust of Anatole, but Natasha bursts out in anger at her and leaves. Natasha writes to Mary and breaks off her engagement with Andrey ("Sonya & Natasha"). Alone, Sonya reflects on her love for her cousin and her determination to save her, even if she will lose her closest friend ("Sonya Alone").

That evening, Anatole and Dolokhov prepare for an elopement between Anatole and Natasha. Dolokhov attempts to change Anatole's mind, but is unsuccessful ("Preparations"). Balaga, their troika driver, arrives to take them to Natasha's house where they will retrieve her before departing ("Balaga"). When they arrive at Natasha's house, citizens of Moscow are there to bid their goodbyes to Anatole and Natasha, but are thwarted at the last moment by Marya. ("The Abduction").

Marya scolds Natasha, who reveals to her and Sonya that she broke off her engagement with Andrey and reaffirms her love for Anatole, whom she still believes is unmarried. Natasha screams at Marya and Sonya and bursts into tears as she waits all night for Anatole ("In My House"). Marya calls on Pierre in the middle of the night and explains the situation to him, begging him to handle the crisis. Pierre tells Marya that Anatole is already married. ("A Call to Pierre"). Pierre, outraged, searches Moscow for Anatole while Marya and Sonya tell a grief-stricken Natasha that Anatole is already married, although she does not believe them. Pierre eventually finds Anatole at Hélène’s house ("Find Anatole"). Pierre orders Anatole to leave Moscow and he agrees ("Pierre & Anatole"). Natasha attempts to take her own life by poisoning herself with arsenic, but lives ("Natasha Very Ill").

The next day, Andrey returns home from the war and is disoriented about the refusal of marriage he received from Natasha, which he asks Pierre about. Pierre explains the scandal to him and pleads with him to be compassionate, but Andrey is unable to forgive Natasha and cold-heartedly tells Pierre that he will not ask for her hand in marriage again ("Pierre and Andrey"). Pierre visits a shattered Natasha and comforts her, giving her hope ("Pierre & Natasha"). After their meeting, Pierre experiences a moment of enlightenment as he watches the Great Comet of 1812 soar across the night sky ("The Great Comet of 1812").

Music
Malloy's original score (orchestrated by the composer) merges Russian folk and classical music with indie rock and EDM influences. The piece is described by the composer as an "electropop opera" and is through-composed, with just one line of spoken dialogue, in Pierre and Natasha's only scene together. On stage, nearly all of the actors play musical instruments augmenting the show's orchestra. Pierre plays the accordion briefly, and plays large sections of the score on the orchestra's piano.

The libretto contains many passages taken word-for-word from Aylmer and Louise Maude's 1922 translation of Tolstoy's novel.

Musical numbers

Act I

Act II

Note: An aria for Natasha, "Natasha Lost", was cut during the Broadway production but is included on the original cast recording between number 8 ("Natasha & Anatole") and number 9 ("The Duel"). "Dust and Ashes" was added for the Broadway production.

Productions

Off-Broadway

Ars Nova 
The musical premiered on October 16, 2012, at Ars Nova. Directed by Rachel Chavkin the show was staged as an immersive production, with action happening around and among the audience. The set designed by Mimi Lien and lights by Bradley King transformed Ars Nova into a Russian supper club. The creative team was completed by Paloma Young as costume designer, Matt Hubbs as sound designer, and Dave Malloy as musical director. The cast included Malloy as Pierre, Phillipa Soo as Natasha, Lucas Steele as Anatole, Amber Gray as Hélène, Brittain Ashford as Sonya, Manik Choksi as Dolokhov, Gelsey Bell as Mary, Blake DeLong as Andrey/Prince Bolkonsky, Amelia Workman as Marya D. and Paul Pinto (who also served as associate music director) as Balaga. The show was the first production of Ars Nova to ever transfer to Broadway.

Kazino 
On May 16, 2013, the show opened in the Meatpacking District at Kazino, a temporary structure designed as an opulent Russian club, where the immersive production was staged, again by the same creative team. The cast reprised their roles, except Choksi, now replaced by Ian Lassiter, and Workman, replaced by Grace McLean. David Abeles took over the role of Pierre on July 9, 2013. The show closed on September 1, 2013.

The show opened for a 14-week limited engagement in September 2013 at the Kazino and moved to the Theater District, with the final cast of the previous production: Choksi reprised the role of Dolokhov, Bell was replaced by Shaina Taub, and Pinto was replaced by Ashkon Davaran. On December 10, 2013, the two-disc cast recording was released. The show was extended and ran until March 2, 2014.

American Repertory Theater (A.R.T.) 
The team behind the original production remounted the show at the American Repertory Theatre (A.R.T.) in Cambridge, Massachusetts, with performances beginning December 1, 2015 to January 2016. Now expanded to a proscenium stage, the set put audience onstage, with unique seating options, with banquette and dining tables added. Scott Stangland took over the role of Pierre, Denée Benton starred as Natasha, Lilli Cooper as Hélène, Nicholas Belton as Andrey/Prince Bolkonsky and the rest of the cast reprised their roles.

Broadway

Imperial Theatre 
The Broadway production at the Imperial Theatre began previews on October 18, 2016 and opened on November 14, 2016, starring Josh Groban as Pierre and Denée Benton as Natasha, both making their Broadway debuts, with choreography by Sam Pinkleton, sets by Mimi Lien, costumes by Paloma Young, lights by Bradley King, sound by Nicholas Pope and music direction by Or Matias. With sets similar to the A.R.T. remounting, the production took the proscenium stage, but removed almost 200 seats from the audience to accommodate the design. Again, the options of stage seats, in banquettes or dining tables, were available. The Broadway production cost about $14 million to stage, most of which was not recouped.

The Broadway production played its final performance on September 3, 2017, having played 32 previews and 336 performances.

International
The show had its international premiere in Quito, Ecuador in September 2014, in a Spanish-language production produced by Teatro Parapluie.

A Brazilian production opened in August 2018, in Portuguese, with Bruna Guerin as Natasha, André Frateschi as Pierre and Gabriel Leone as Anatole. The production won the Prêmio Reverência popular vote Award for "Best Musical."

A Japanese production, helmed by the entertainment company Toho, opened at the Tokyo Metropolitan Theatre on January 5, 2019 and ran through January 27, 2019. It starred Nogizaka46's Erika Ikuta as Natasha and Yoshio Inoue as Pierre.

The Korean production will be held starting from March 2021, until May 2021.

Variety also reports that productions in London and Korea are currently under discussion, with additional interest in China and the Philippines.

The Canadian premiere produced by Musical Stage Co. and Crow's Theatre was set to run from January 26 to February 14, 2021 at the Winter Garden Theatre in Toronto, but was suspended due to the COVID-19 pandemic and subsequent shutdown of the theatrical industry.

The European premiere will open in February 2023 at the Landestheater Linz in Austria.

Regional
Licensing rights for The Great Comet are available through Samuel French, Inc. Capital City Theatre of Madison, Wisconsin staged the production June 3-12, 2022. The West Coast premiere is slated for Fall of 2022 with the Shotgun Players in Berkeley, California. In March of 2022, Tantrum Theatre in Athens, OH will premiere the first east coast production post Broadway. This production is produced in tandem with Ohio University, of which Malloy is an alumni. A production was premiered by the Weitzenhoffer Family College of Fine Arts at the University of Oklahoma in October of 2022.

Characters

(Lines in quotations are lyrics from the opening song, "Prologue," which introduces the characters)

Original principal casts

Replacements 

 Pierre Bezukhov - Dave Malloy, Okieriete Onaodowan.
 Sonya Rostova - Ingrid Michaelson.

Critical response
The piece was very well received by the New York press. Charles Isherwood in The New York Times called it "a vibrant, transporting new musical," and both Times theater critics included the show on their Best of the Year lists. The Times' classical critic, Anthony Tommasini, called it "a breathless, roughish and ravishing quasi-opera. This is a pastiche score of a cavalier sort. Mr. Malloy lifts styles with such abandon, making willful shifts – from punk riffs to agitated Broadway ballads, mock-pompous recitative to gritty Russian folk songs or drinking choruses with klezmer clarinets – that you lose track of what is being appropriated and really don't care." Time Out New York gave the piece five out of five stars, and also included it on both critics' Best of lists, stating "this is theater like no other in New York. It grounds you and transports you at once, and leaves you beaming with pleasure.”

Controversy
Josh Groban played his final performance on July 2. Okieriete Onaodowan assumed the role of Pierre on July 11; he was originally supposed to begin performances on July 3, but needed more time to prepare. Onaodowan's performance was well received, but the show continued to struggle financially with the departure of Groban. The producers attempted to bring in Broadway legend Mandy Patinkin to boost ticket sales and prevent the show from closing. On July 26, 2017, a day before the official announcement, the website Broadway Black broke the news that Patinkin was set to replace Okieriete Onaodowan as Pierre for three weeks, cutting Onoadowan's run short by a couple of weeks due to Patinkin's busy schedule.

Many fans and actors were angered by this casting decision, as Patinkin was an older, white actor replacing Onaodowan (Patinkin is actually an Ashkenazi Jew). A Twitter campaign was begun by Rafael Casal, a friend of Onaodowan who coined the hashtag #makeroomforoak. The controversy led to Patinkin withdrawing from the show two days later and Dave Malloy assumed the role of Pierre for the remainder of the running. The show closed a little over a month later, on September 3, 2017, citing this controversy and the declining ticket sales.

Awards and nominations

Original Off-Broadway production 
Sources: TheaterMania Internet Off-Broadway DatabaseVillage Voice

Original Cambridge production

Original Broadway production

Recordings

On December 10, 2013 Ghostlight Records released a two-disc original cast album of the entire score. Later, another disc containing highlights from the show was released.

The original Broadway cast recording was released on May 19, 2017 on Reprise Records. It went on to chart at number 87 on the Billboard 200 chart, number 26 on the Top Album Sales chart, and number 23 on the Digital Albums chart.

Book 
On November 22, 2016 the book Natasha, Pierre, and the Great Comet of 1812: The Journey of a New Musical to Broadway was released. The book, edited and compiled by Steven Suskin, includes interviews with many of the original cast members, as well as the annotated script and photos of both the Kazino and Broadway casts. The book also includes a CD with five songs from the show: three from the original cast recording, and two featuring Josh Groban and a 25 piece orchestra.

Notes

References

External links
 Internet Off-Broadway Database
 Internet Broadway Database
 Working in the Theatre Episode on Adaptation

2012 musicals
Adaptations of works by Leo Tolstoy
Broadway musicals
Musicals based on novels
Off-Broadway musicals
Plays set in the 19th century
Plays set in the Russian Empire
Rock operas
Sung-through musicals
War and Peace
Musicals by Dave Malloy
Tony Award-winning musicals